The Aiguille de Blaitière (3,522 m) is a mountain in the Mont Blanc Massif in Haute-Savoie, France.

Mountains of the Alps
Mountains of Haute-Savoie
Alpine three-thousanders